This is a list of international schools in Hong Kong.

Elementary schools

Secondary schools

Former schools
 Indonesian School

See also
List of international schools in the People's Republic of China
List of international schools
List of English Schools Foundation schools
List of primary schools in Hong Kong
List of secondary schools in Hong Kong
List of universities in Hong Kong
List of schools in Hong Kong

References

+
International
Hong Kong
Hong Kong